The 2001 All-Ireland Under-21 Hurling Championship final was a hurling match that was played at Semple Stadium, Thurles on 16 September 2001 to determine the winners of the 2001 All-Ireland Under-21 Hurling Championship, the 38th season of the All-Ireland Under-21 Hurling Championship, a tournament organised by the Gaelic Athletic Association for the champion teams of the four provinces of Ireland. The final was contested by Limerick of Munster and Wexford of Leinster, with Limerick winning by 0-17 to 2-10.

Match

Details

References

2001 in hurling
All-Ireland Under-21 Hurling Championship Finals
Limerick GAA matches
Wexford GAA matches